The 2014–15 Danish 2nd Divisions will be the divided in two groups of sixteen teams. The two group winners will be promoted to the 2015–16 Danish 1st Division.

Following the season the league will be reduced from 32 to 24 participants. This means that 11 teams will be relegated.

Because of an uneven distribution of West and East-teams (divided by the Great Belt), one East-team, Næstved BK, volunteered to join the West-division.

Nordvest FC will from this season be competing under the club's original name Holbæk B&I.

Participants

East

League table

West

League table

Topscores

East 
<ref></http://www.bold.dk/fodbold/danmark/2-division-oest/</ref>

West 
<ref></http://www.bold.dk/fodbold/danmark/2-division-vest/</ref>

Play-offs

Relegation game
The teams placed 11th in each group will play promotion game on home and away basis.

References

3
Danish 2nd Divisions
Danish 2nd Division seasons